Kurnyavtsevo is a rural locality (a village) in Bryansky District, Bryansk Oblast, Russia. The population was 350 as of 2010. There are 25 streets.

Geography 
Kurnyavtsevo is located 24 km southeast of Glinishchevo (the district's administrative centre) by road. Antonovka and Suponevo are the nearest rural localities.

References 

Rural localities in Bryansky District